Mayo-Darlé is a town and commune in Cameroon. It had a tin mine nearby from c 1935 to c 1980 (see Nguene 1982). One of the commonly known villages in Mayo-Darle is Wouro-Yobi which is known for rearing cattle and farming of corn and vegetables.

See also
Communes of Cameroon

References
 Site de la primature - Élections municipales 2002 
 Contrôle de gestion et performance des services publics communaux des villes camerounaises - Thèse de Donation Avele, Université Montesquieu Bordeaux IV 
 Charles Nanga, La réforme de l’administration territoriale au Cameroun à la lumière de la loi constitutionnelle n° 96/06 du 18 janvier 1996, Mémoire ENA. 
François Roger Nguene, Geology and Geochemistry of the Mayo-Darlé Tin Deposit, West-central Cameroon, Central Africa, New Mexico Institute of Mining and Technology, 1982, 358 p. (Ph. D.)

Communes of Cameroon
Populated places in Adamawa Region